Brian L. Clem (born 1972) is an American politician who served as a member of the Oregon House of Representatives for the 21st district (largely from 2007 to 2021.

Career 
Claim was first elected to the House 2006, defeating incumbent Republican Billy Dalto. On July 6, 2009, Clem told the Oregonian newspaper that he was considering a run for governor of Oregon in 2010. However, he did not enter the race. In late-October 2021, he resigned from the legislature, stating he was going to take care of his mother who has Alzheimer's disease.

References

1972 births
Living people
Democratic Party members of the Oregon House of Representatives
People from Coos Bay, Oregon
21st-century American politicians